USS Copeland (FFG-25) was the seventeenth ship of the  of guided-missile frigates in the United States Navy. She was named for Rear Admiral Robert W. Copeland (1910–1973).

Ordered from Todd Pacific Shipyards, Los Angeles Division, San Pedro, California on 28 February 1977 as part of the FY77 program, Copeland was laid down on 24 October 1979, launched on 26 July 1980, and commissioned on 7 August 1982.  Decommissioned and stricken on 18 September 1996, she was transferred to Egypt the same day as Mubarak (F911). After the 2011 revolution the ship was renamed to remove the former ruler's name. The ship is named Alexandria (F911) now. , she remained in active service with the Egyptian Navy.

Copeland was the first ship of that name in the US Navy.

References

External links 

MaritimeQuest USS Copeland (FFG-25) pages

Oliver Hazard Perry-class frigates of the United States Navy
Ships built in Los Angeles
1980 ships
Cold War frigates and destroyer escorts of the United States
Mubarak-class frigates
Frigates of Egypt